Richard Edwards (born 27 January 1989) is a former professional Welsh darts player, currently playing in British Darts Organisation events. He qualified for the 2018 BDO World Darts Championship.

Career
James Hurrell withdrew from the 2018 BDO World Darts Championship. Edwards was next highest ranked player who did not qualify, he played Danny Noppert in the first round and lost 3-0 with an average of only 71.

World Championship results

BDO
 2018: 1st Round (lost to Danny Noppert 0-3) (sets)

References

External links
 Richie Edwards' profile and stats on Darts Database

Living people
Welsh darts players
British Darts Organisation players
1989 births